Letters from a Flying Machine is an album by American singer/songwriter Peter Mulvey, released in 2009.

Letters from a Flying Machine is a collection of new songs and spoken-word "letters" by Mulvey, the letters written while in flight to his nieces and nephews.

Reception

Allmusic's review of the album wrote of the spoken word sections "Most are painful to listen to, lacking the grace and lighthearted humor that mark his songwriting," but wrote the songs "aren't as heavy-handed, even when they take on weighty subjects."

Track listing
All songs by Peter Mulvey unless noted.
 "Kids in the Square" (Peter Mulvey, Tim Gearan) – 3:43
 "Some People" – 3:17
 "Letter from a Flying Machine" [spoken] – 3:02
 "Windshield" – 3:42
 "What's Keeping Erica?" (Mulvey, Paul Cebar) – 3:08
 ". . . Plus the Many Inevitable Fragments" [spoken] – 2:40
 "Dynamite Bill" (Mulvey, Gearan) – 3:21
 "Shoulderbirds (You Know Me)" (Mulvey, Gearan) – 3:37
 "Bears" (spoken) – 3:54
 "Mailman" – 3:15
 "Vlad the Astrophysicist" [spoken] – 5:40
 "On a Wing and a Prayer" (Mulvey, Tim Fagan) – 3:42
 "Love is Here to Stay" (George Gershwin, Ira Gershwin) – 1:55

Personnel
Peter Mulvey – acoustic guitar, vocals, bells
Kris Delmhorst – vocals
 David "Goody" Goodrich – guitar, slide guitar
 Chris Wagoner – mandolin, violin, viola
 Randy Sabien – violin
 Mary Gaines – cello
 Steve Yarbro – clarinet
 Nathan Kilen – percussion

Production notes
 Produced by Dave Chalfant and Peter Mulvey
 Engineered by Ric Probst and Al Williams
 Mixed by David Chalfant
 Mastered by Ian Kennedy
 Art & Design by Peter Nevins

References

2009 albums
Peter Mulvey albums